"You Say" is a song by American contemporary Christian music singer and songwriter Lauren Daigle. It is the lead single from her third studio album, Look Up Child. Written by Daigle, alongside producers Paul Mabury and Jason Ingram, it was released as a single on July 13, 2018. It reached No. 29 on the Billboard Hot 100, her first entry on the chart.  It also reached the top ten in Belgium. It is also Daigle's third No. 1 on the Hot Christian Songs chart. The song debuted at No. 22 on the Christian Airplay chart, becoming the best start for a non-holiday song by a solo female artist in over eight years, since Francesca Battistelli's "Beautiful, Beautiful" debuted at No. 21 on March 20, 2010. The song has spent 132 weeks at No. 1 on Hot Christian Songs, breaking the record for the most weeks spent at No. 1 by a song.

The song was a huge Christian radio success, peaking at No. 1 on multiple different charts including the Christian adult contemporary (AC) radio chart and Christian AC Indicator chart. It was released to mainstream radio on January 15, 2019 by Warner Bros. From there, it reached the Adult Top 40, Adult Contemporary, and Mainstream Top 40 charts. It was the second-biggest Christian song of 2018 in the US, the biggest Christian song of both 2019 and 2020 in the US, and the second-biggest Christian song of the entire 2010's decade in the US. It is certified four-times platinum in the US.

It won the 2019 Grammy Award for Best Contemporary Christian Music Performance/Song. It also won Top Christian Song at the 2019 Billboard Music Awards.

Background
"You Say" was released on July 13, 2018, as the lead single for her third studio album Look Up Child. The song was released to Christian radio on July 9. Daigle sat down for a podcast with Billboard, and discussed her new single and upcoming album. "I knew this would be a song of my identity," she says. "'You say I am loved.' That's the truth." As for the album, Daigle says, "I want this to be such a record of joy, such a record of hope, that people experience a childlikeness again. In the time of making this record, I had to remember who I was as a child. I want people to reflect on, 'The innocence of my childhood … how do I see myself through those eyes again? How do I love myself like that again? Where's that joy? Where's that hope?'"

Composition
"You Say" is originally in the key of F major, with a tempo of 74 beats per minute. Written in common time, the song is based around a chord progression of F-Am–Dm–B. Daigle's vocal range spans from D3 to A4 during the song.

Commercial performance
The song debuted at No. 53 on the Billboard Hot 100 on the issue week of July 28, 2018. In its ninth week, it climbed to No. 44; it reached a new peak of No. 29 in March 2019. It remained on the chart for 43 weeks.

It debuted at No. 33 on the Billboard Christian Songs chart on the issue week of July 21, 2018. The following week, it jumped to No. 1, becoming Daigle's third No. 1 on the chart, and breaking the record for the biggest jump to No. 1. It has since stayed there for 113 weeks, breaking the record for longest running song in the chart's history held by "Oceans (Where Feet May Fail)" by Hillsong United. As of April 25, 2019, it has stayed on the chart for 101 weeks. The song has spent 17 weeks at No. 1 on the Christian Airplay chart. The song also crossed over to the Canadian Hot 100, New Zealand Hot Singles chart, and Scotland Singles Chart, and Belgian Ultratip Chart, France, Switzerland and in the Netherlands.

It also debuted at No. 5 on the Billboard Digital Songs chart, breaking the record for the highest-ever debut by a contemporary Christian artist with a non-holiday song. It was ranked at No. 50 on Billboards Decade-End Digital Songs chart. It also crossed over to the Billboard Adult Top 40 chart, peaking at No. 5.

The song received a quadruple platinum certification from the Recording Industry Association of America (RIAA) on March 3, 2021.

Music video
A music video for the single "You Say" was released on July 13, 2018. The video shows Daigle singing the song around a house in soft, golden-hour lighting. The video has over 268 million views on YouTube.

Credits and personnel
Credits adapted from Tidal.
Lauren Daigle – vocals, songwriter
Jason Ingram – songwriter
Paul Mabury – songwriter
Joe La Porta – mastering engineer

Track listings 

CD single
"You Say" — 4:34

Digital download
"You Say" (piano/vocal) — 4:36

Digital download (Spanglish version)
"Tú Dices"  — 4:33

Live performances
Daigle first performed the single "You Say" in the close out of the 2018 GMA Dove Awards. She also performed the track on Good Morning America. She then performed the song on Jimmy Kimmel Live! on February 26, 2019. On May 1, 2019, Daigle performed the song during the 2019 Billboard Music Awards. In December 2020, Daigle performed "You Say" on the season 19 finale of The Voice.

Accolades

Charts

Weekly charts

Year-end charts

Decade-end charts

Certifications and sales

Release history

See also
List of Billboard Adult Contemporary number ones of 2019

References

2018 singles
2018 songs
Lauren Daigle songs
Songs written by Jason Ingram
Warner Records singles